Dimitris Kolovetsios (Greek: Δημήτρης Κολοβέτσιος; born 16 October 1991) is a Greek professional footballer who plays as a centre-back for Turkish Süper Lig club Kayserispor.

Club career

AEL
Born and raised in Larissa, Kolovetsios began playing football with his boyhood football club AEL.

PAS Giannina
In 2012, Kolovetsios  transferred to Super League side PAS Giannina. His impressing performances attracted the interest of many topflight Greek teams such as Olympiacos, PAOK and AEK Athens.

AEK Athens
In the summer of 2014, Kolovetsios signed with AEK Athens for €250,000. He made his debut on 29 August in a match against Fokikos for the first round of the Greek Cup. He finished the season with a total of 27 appearances and 2 goals.

On 27 June 2017, it was officially announced that the player's contract with AEK was not renewed and the player is now a free agent.

Panathinaikos
On 3 July 2017, Kolovetsios joined Panathinaikos on a two-year deal.
The 26 year old defender signed a two year deal after leaving AEK Athens as a free agent, but in the first half of the season his performances have largely been solid but unspectacular. Having started the season as third choice centre back behind Rodrigo Moledo and Giorgos Koutroubis, the Larissa born defender has gradually earned the trust of Marinos Ouzounidis to become a starter at the expense of the latter. In addition to this, he can also provide cover at right back if need be. He has stepped in a few times when Ousmane Coulibaly has been injured.

On 4 January 2019, Kolovetsios agreed to a contract extension until the summer of 2022. Signed by Marinos Ouzounidis in the summer of 2017 on a free transfer from AEK, Kolovetsios has drastically improved under Giorgos Donis, earning a call up to the Ethniki squad along the way as a reward for his efforts. On 14 January 2019, Panathinaikos then turned the game on its head by taking a 2–1 lead in the 68th minute through Kolovetsios, who headed past Xanthi goalkeeper Živko Živković from the rebound after Christos Donis’ shot had been saved, in a 2–2 home draw against Xanthi. It was his first goal with the club in all competitions. On 10 November 2019, former AEK Athens defender, Kolovetsios was left unmarked and scored a great header from a corner to give Panathinaikos a memorable 3–2 comeback win against rivals AEK Athens. On 1 July 2020, with two minutes left Kolovetsios rose highest to score after a corner delivered by Giannis Bouzoukis, in a 2–0 home win game against Aris.

Kayserispor
On 15 September 2020, Kayserispor has announced the signing of the Greek defender on a two years contract for an undisclosed fee. The Turkish club had agreed with both Panathinaikos (it will keep a resale rate of 30%) and the player, but they had to wait for a while for the transfers' ban to be lifted permanently, imposed on them last season for breaches of the licensing regulation.
On 23 December 2021, Kolovetsios was extremely unlucky in the match between his club and Yeni Malatyaspor, as a forced change was made due to injury and the examinations he underwent showed that he had a ruptured anterior cruciate ligament in his left knee, that will keep him in the sidelines for at least six months. In June 2022, Kolovetsios extended his contract with Kayserispor until 2023.Kolovetsios played his first match of the 2022-23 season against Beşiktaş in the 1st week match of Super League on 6 August 2022 and remained on the field for 90 minutes.

International career
On 19 March 2019, Greece head coach Angelos Anastasiadis announced the call-up of Mavrias for the match against Liechtenstein and Bosnia and Herzegovina for UEFA Euro 2020. Anastasiadis called up Panathinaikos defender to replace Petros Mantalos in the squad for the upcoming qualifiers.

Career statistics

Club
 

(* Include UEFA Europa League)

(** Include Greek Playoffs)

Honours
AEK Athens
Football League: 2014–15
Greek Cup: 2015–16

References

External links
 Footballdatabase Profile
 
 Dimitrios Kolovetsios at Kayserispor
 Myplayer.gr
 

1991 births
Living people
Footballers from Larissa
Greek footballers
Association football defenders
Athlitiki Enosi Larissa F.C. players
PAS Giannina F.C. players
AEK Athens F.C. players
Panathinaikos F.C. players
Kayserispor footballers
Super League Greece players
Football League (Greece) players
Süper Lig players
Greek expatriate footballers
Expatriate footballers in Turkey
Greek expatriate sportspeople in Turkey